Adrian Guy Duplantier Sr. (March 5, 1929 – August 15, 2007) was a United States district judge of the United States District Court for the Eastern District of Louisiana. He served as a Democratic member of the Louisiana State Senate, representing a portion of Orleans Parish for four terms.

Education and career
Duplantier was born in New Orleans. He graduated from the Roman Catholic Jesuit High School in 1945 and graduated from Loyola University New Orleans College of Law in 1949.

State senate and judicial service

Failed bid for mayor of New Orleans in 1960, despite winning nearly all of the black vote, but losing the election to Victor H. Schiro

Federal judicial service

On April 24, 1978, Duplantier was nominated by President Jimmy Carter to a seat on the United States District Court for the Eastern District of Louisiana vacated by Judge Roger Blake West. Duplantier was confirmed by the United States Senate on May 26, 1978, and received his commission on May 31, 1978. He assumed senior status on March 6, 1994, and served until his death, in New Orleans.

Duplantier and two other Louisiana Democrats, former State Treasurer Mary Evelyn Parker and  former State Representative Risley C. Triche of Napoleonville in Assumption Parish, were interviewed for the 2001 book Welfare Racism: Playing the Race Card Against America's Poor. The three testified to their personal knowledge of racism in 1960–1961 in Louisiana against African American public assistance recipients.

References

Sources
 Obituary at Legacy.com
 New York Times search
 Judge Duplantier was generous benefactor of Loyola University
 Hon. Adrian Duplantier '45 Devoted Blue Jay and Founder of Boys' Hope, Inducted into the Hall of Honors
 The Life and Times of The Hon. Adrian G. Duplantier

External links
 
 

1929 births
2007 deaths
Democratic Party Louisiana state senators
Politicians from New Orleans
Jesuit High School (New Orleans) alumni
Judges of the United States District Court for the Eastern District of Louisiana
United States district court judges appointed by Jimmy Carter
20th-century American judges
Loyola University New Orleans alumni
University of Virginia School of Law alumni
Deaths from pancreatic cancer
Lawyers from New Orleans
Burials in Louisiana